Several Bulgarian individuals and Bulgarian-produced films have been nominated for the Academy Awards in different categories. , four Bulgarians have been nominated and two have won Oscars including in the scientific and technical category.

At the 44th Academy Awards, Dimitar Petrov's 1971 film Porcupines Are Born Without Bristles was Bulgaria's first submission for the Academy Award for Best International Feature Film category. At the 82nd Academy Awards, The World Is Big and Salvation Lurks Around the Corner became the first Bulgarian film to be shortlisted to compete in the category; however, it was not nominated.

In 2017, filmmaker Theodore Ushev became the first Bulgarian person to be nominated for an Academy Award in a competitive category, receiving a nomination for Best Animated Short Film for Blind Vaysha (2016).

Competitive awards

Scientific and technical awards

See also 

 List of Bulgarian submissions for the Academy Award for Best International Feature Film
Cinema of Bulgaria

Footnotes

References 

Bulgarian
Academy Awards